Mbelala (Belala), or Tombelala, is an Austronesian language of Central Sulawesi, Indonesia.

References

Kaili–Pamona languages
Languages of Sulawesi